Star Voyager is an outer space shooter for the Nintendo Entertainment System. The gameplay is a first-person shooter from inside the cockpit of a spaceship. The player navigates "sub spaces" of a larger "world map." Gameplay takes place between different subspaces.

Gameplay
The plot centers around a lone pilot in a spacecraft attempting to protect a transport ship, the CosmoStation Noah, full of planetary refugees from a fleet of intergalactic terrorists known as the Molok Wardrivers. The player's primary goal is to eliminate all enemy fleets before they can surround the stationary Cosmostation Noah. The player may also visit up to eight different planets in search of engine and weapon upgrades for their ship, may seek repairs at up to five space stations in addition to CosmoStation Noah, and may also visit an asteroid field, and a black hole from which escape is difficult but not impossible. The game is won if the player defeats the enemy armada and safely returns to base. However, the game is lost if the enemy fleet reaches the CosmoStation Noah, the player enters the black hole, the player's ship runs out of fuel crystals, or if life support fails.

Gameplay occurs on a 10x10 grid that is randomized at the start of each game with the exceptions of the player and CosmoStation Noah which will always begin in the top left, and the five initial Molok Wardriver fleets will begin in the bottom right. To progress through the grid, the player must select their destination coordinates either through the HUD or the select menu grid, and hold down the B button to charge enough power to travel to as many sectors as required to reach their destination, as identified by the number on the bottom-center of the HUD. The number of leaps charged is indicated by icons in the upper-left gauge.

As gameplay progresses, additional fleets may join the Molok Wardriver armada. Any planets or space stations they encounter during their trek to the CosmoStation Noah will be destroyed, limiting the resources the player will have to mount an attack. In order to destroy the enemy fleets, the player must warp to their coordinates and destroy the fleet's spacecraft and mothership, which will endlessly deploy enemy spacecraft as long as it remains operational. The player must raise their shields in the select menu in order to minimize damage taken to the ship.

The player's fuel crystals will deplete normally over time, and faster during warping or sustaining damage. Therefore, it is necessary to visit space stations to refuel to prolong gameplay. They can also repair damaged systems which include radar, engines, and weapons, but a malfunctioning life support system can be repaired only at the CosmoStation Noah. Depending on the amount of damage taken, the engines may become inoperable, one or both laser cannons can malfunction, and radar can become difficult to use.

References

External links
 Star Voyager at GameFAQs
 
 Star Voyager English-Japanese title translation

1986 video games
ASCII Corporation games
First-person shooters
Science fiction video games
Nintendo Entertainment System games
Nintendo Entertainment System-only games
Single-player video games
Video games developed in Japan
Acclaim Entertainment games